Coffeen Lake State Fish and Wildlife Area is an Illinois state park on  in Montgomery County, Illinois, United States just south of Coffeen.

History

The original power company built a 75-foot high earthen dam on a branch of the east Fork of Shoal Creek in 1963. The lake filled by 1966 and now serves as cooling water for the coal-fired Coffeen Power Station. The site was opened as a fish and wildlife area in 1986 and operates under a long-term lease and management agreement between the Illinois Department of Natural Resources and Dynegy. This agreement grants authority to the State to open the lake and certain lands to the public for recreational activities, such as fishing, boating, picnicking and hunting.

Natural features

The oak-hickory forests surrounding Coffeen Lake are representative of the native cover found within the Southern Till Plain Natural Division of central and southern Illinois. Soils are of loess and till, rather light and a characteristic "claypan" can be found. Pre-settlement vegetation was a mixture of 60 percent forest to 40 percent prairie and wetlands. A variety of trees, woodland and prairie plants cover the slopes of the stream valley.  Muskrats, turtles, herons and mussels are seen in or near the water. Red-tailed hawk, blue jay and dragonflies may be seen overhead. Bobwhite, coyote, white-tailed deer and black rat snake are common to the area.

References

External links
 Coffeen Illinois, Historical Society of Montgomery County Illinois

State parks of Illinois
Protected areas of Montgomery County, Illinois
Protected areas established in 1966
1966 establishments in Illinois